

East Finchley Methodist Church is a Methodist church at 197 High Road, Finchley, London, part of the Barnet and Queensbury Circuit.

See also
Finchley Methodist Church

References

External links

EFM History Project

Methodist churches in London
Finchley